Myrovrysi is a mountain village in the municipal unit of Sympoliteia, Achaea, Greece. It is located in the eastern foothills of the Panachaiko, 11 km south of Selianitika and 44.3 Km east of Patras. In 2011, it had a population of 211.

References

Aigialeia
Populated places in Achaea